ARCI or Arci may refer to:

 International Advanced Research Centre for Powder Metallurgy & New Materials (ARCI), in the Department of Science and Technology (India)
 Addiction Research Center Inventory, a questionnaire for assessing effects of psychoactive drugs
 ARCI matrix, a responsibility assignment matrix
 Associazione Ricreativa e Culturale Italiana, an Italian non-profit association
 Ayn Rand Center Israel, affiliated with the Ayn Rand Institute, an American non-profit
 Autosomal recessive congenital ichthyosis, a type of skin disorder

See also
 Arcis (disambiguation)
 Arkoi, a small Greek island